Belgium competed at the 2022 European Athletics Championships in Munich, Germany, between 15 and 21 August 2022. A delegation of 59 athletes was sent to represent the country.

Medals

Results

The following athletes were selected to compete by the Royal Belgian Athletics Federation.
 including alternates
Key
Note–Ranks given for track events are within the athlete's heat only
Q = Qualified for the next round
q = Qualified for the next round as a fastest loser or, in field events, by position without achieving the qualifying target
NR = National record
CHB = Championship best
WL = World Leading
PB = Personal best
SB = Season's best
— = Round not applicable for the event
Bye = Athlete not required to compete in round
DNF = Did not finish
DNS = Did not start
NM = No valid trial recorded

 Men 
Track and road events

1ran only the heats
2 ran only the final
3did not come in action

Field events

Combined events – Decathlon

Women
Track and road events

1 ran only the heats
2ran only the final
3did not come in action

Field events

Combined events – Heptathlon

References

European Athletics Championships
2022
Nations at the 2022 European Athletics Championships